Terdema Lamar Ussery II (born December 4, 1958) is a senior partner and general council for Verreaux Consulting Group. He is the former president and CEO of the National Basketball Association’s Dallas Mavericks. During that time, he also served as president of the Dallas Mavericks Foundation as well as an alternate governor for the Mavericks on the NBA Board of Governors. He is also interim general council for Buena Vista Visions.

Career 

Ussery was born in Los Angeles and grew up in the Watts–Compton section of South Central Los Angeles, California, and attended The Thacher School in Ojai, California. In 1981, he earned a bachelor's degree from the Woodrow Wilson School of Public and International Affairs at Princeton University, where he was a football team walk-on. Ussery obtained a master's degree from Harvard's John F. Kennedy School of Government in 1984. His law degree is from UC Berkeley, where he served as an executive editor of the California Law Review. Ussery also holds a Masters Degree from the Yale Divinity School.

Ussery practiced business law at the international firm of Morrison and Foerster representing Bank of America and the Industrial Bank of Japan, among others. He moved to Denver to become the deputy commissioner and general counsel of the Continental Basketball Association (CBA) on the invitation of then-commissioner Irv Kaze. Ussery eventually became CBA Commissioner, the first African American to operate a professional sports league.  His two-and-a-half-year term was highlighted by a rapid increase in franchise value and overall league-wide financial stability. While serving as CBA commissioner, Ussery's accomplishments were profiled in Sports Illustrated, The Wall Street Journal, USA Today and a host of other national publications.

In August 1993, Ussery was named president of Nike Sports Management. While reporting to Nike chairman and CEO Phil Knight, Ussery's responsibilities included marketing, advertising, branding, and negotiating on behalf of and marketing Nike's most elite pro athletes, including Alonzo Mourning, Ki-Jana Carter, Deion Sanders, Ken Griffey Jr., Picabo Street, Roy Jones Jr., Dan O'Brien, Scottie Pippen and Mike Mussina. Nike Sports Management was also integral in the launch of Coca-Cola's Powerade brand.

Ussery was appointed as CEO of the Dallas Mavericks in 1997, upon which he announced his goal to make his organization the best sports entertainment company in the country. In his first season with the Mavericks, he led a successful campaign which resulted in public funding in the amount of $240 million for the construction of the American Airlines Center. He actively participated in the architectural selection, design and construction of the building. Ussery was also intimately involved in securing the naming rights partnership with Dallas–Fort Worth-based American Airlines for the downtown facility.

Under his direction, the club more than tripled revenue and increased its media and digital footprint by establishing new (and expanding existing) media partnerships across multiple platforms. The Mavericks are entering their eleventh consecutive sold-out season. Additionally, the Dallas Maverick Foundation has distributed over $1 million to over forty agencies whose aim and mission is to improve the lives of those in need. Both Sports Illustrated and The Sporting News have previously ranked Ussery as one of the most powerful executives in sports, and in 2003 Ussery was named the Corporate Executive of the Year by Black Enterprise Magazine. Additionally, the Mavericks are consistently ranked by ESPN as one of the top organizations in all of professional sports.

As one of the original creators and partners of HDNet, Ussery served as its CEO for 10 years. In that capacity, he was responsible for developing and negotiating all of the original content and distribution deals with MSO's covering multi-digital and non-digital platforms. On the content side, this included deals with MLB, the NHL, MLS, the National Lacrosse League, and NHK, The Japanese Broadcasting Company. On the distribution side, Ussery negotiated the launch dealing with DirecTV. He was also primarily responsible for the network's relationship with the Federal Communications Commission (FCC) and other governing bodies.

In 2014, Ussery was among the finalist to replace Billy Hunter as executive director of the National Basketball Players Association.
 
 He is now a senior partner and general council for Verreaux Consulting Group.

Corporate and charitable governance 

Ussery holds positions in several charities and companies, including:
 Dallas Mavericks, President and CEO
 Dallas Housing Authority, Chairman of the Board of Commissioners
 HDNet, CEO
 Andre Agassi Charitable Foundation, Board member
 Board of Trustees, Communities Foundation of Texas.
 Council on Foreign Relations
 Wingate Partners, Advisory Board
 Princeton University, Board of Trustees Member
 Timberland, Board of Directors Member
 Treehouse Foods, Board of Directors Member
 CTS America, Board of Directors Member
 Texas Health Resources, Presbyterian Healthcare Foundation, Board of Directors Member 
 Dallas After School All-Stars, Board of Directors Member
 Dallas Black Dance Theatre, Board of Directors

References

External links 

1958 births
Dallas Mavericks executives
Princeton School of Public and International Affairs alumni
Harvard Kennedy School alumni
UC Berkeley School of Law alumni
National Basketball Association executives
People from Los Angeles
People from Ventura County, California
Living people
African-American sports executives and administrators
Continental Basketball Association commissioners
The Thacher School alumni
21st-century African-American people
20th-century African-American sportspeople
People associated with Morrison & Foerster